Naunhof is a town in the Leipzig district, in the Free State of Saxony, Germany. It is situated on the river Parthe, 11 km northwest of Grimma, and 16 km southeast of Leipzig (centre).

Personalities 
 Ernst Knebel (1892-1945), German general
 Ludwig Külz (1875-1938), German tropical physician
Paul Horst-Schulze (1876-1937), German painter, graphic artist and handicraftsman

Coat of arms 
In red a continuous seven zinnige silver wall with open passage and seated cornered tower with two open windows on each side and pointed roof and golden orb as a knob.

References 

Leipzig (district)